Andrew Hao or Hao Jinli (1916 – March 9, 2011) was the Roman Catholic bishop of the Roman Catholic Diocese of Xiwanzi, China.

Ordained in 1943, Hao arrested in 1958. Released in 1981, he was secretly ordained a bishop in 1984.

Notes

20th-century Roman Catholic bishops in China
1916 births
2011 deaths